Rose of Washington Square is a 1939 American musical drama film, featuring the already well-known popular song with the same title. Set in 1920s New York City, the film focuses on singer Rose Sargent and her turbulent relationship with con artist Barton DeWitt Clinton, whose criminal activities threaten her professional success in the Ziegfeld Follies.

Although the names of the principal characters were changed, the plot was inspired by vaudeville entertainer Fanny Brice's career and marriage to gambler Nicky Arnstein (both the film's title song and "My Man" were closely associated with Brice), and Brice sued 20th Century Fox for $750,000. The studio settled out of court for an undisclosed amount.

Written by Nunnally Johnson (who co-produced with Darryl F. Zanuck) and directed by Gregory Ratoff, it stars Alice Faye, Tyrone Power and Al Jolson, with a supporting cast that includes William Frawley, Joyce Compton, Hobart Cavanaugh, Moroni Olsen, Charles Lane, and Louis Prima.

Plot
Ted Cotter (Al Jolson), a successful Broadway minstrel performer, spots Rose Sargent (Alice Faye) performing in a vaudeville amateur night. He immediately takes a personal and professional interest in her, helping her career along as she joins the famed Ziegfeld Follies and begins to achieve stardom.

Rose does not recognize Ted's love for her, falling instead for Bart Clinton (Tyrone Power), a gambler and con man. Bart's nefarious activities get him arrested, and after Ted puts up his bail, Bart skips town. Rose pines away for him, until one night, when Bart goes to the Follies and hears her tearful rendition of the song "My Man", he realizes the error of his ways and sets out to make things right. As Bart is sent away for a 5-year prison sentence, Rose says "I'll be waiting, darling!"

Cast

 Tyrone Power as Barton Dewitt Clinton
 Alice Faye as Rose Sargent
 Al Jolson as Ted Cotter
 Moroni Olsen as Major Buck Russell
 Winifred Harris as Mrs. Russell
 William Frawley as Harry Long, Rose's manager/agent
 Joyce Compton as Peggy
 Ben Welden as Toby
 Louis Prima as the Bandleader
 Hobart Cavanaugh as Whitey Boone
 Charles C. Wilson as Police Lt. Mike Cavanaugh
 Ralph Dunn as Police Officer
 William Newell as Hotel Desk Clerk
 James C. Morton as Bartender at speakeasy
 Brooks Benedict as Drunk Heckler in theatre box
 Charles Lane as Sam Kress, Booking Agent
 Adrian Morris as Jim
 E.E. Clive as Barouche Driver
 Chick Chandler as Emcee at after-show cast party
 Veloz and Yolanda - Specialty Dancers in title song 
 Harry Hayden as Dexter
 Maurice Cass as Mr. Mok, furniture buyer
 Paul E. Burns as Chump
 Hal K. Dawson as Chump
 Murray Alper as Eddie, candy butcher in theatre
 Charles Tannen as Newspaper Reporter
 Leonard Kibrick as Newsboy
 Bert Roach as Mr. Paunch
 John Hamilton as Judge
 Paul Stanton as District Attorney
 James Flavin as Guard taking Bart to prison

Songs

 "Pretty Baby" – Al Jolson
 "I'm Sorry I Made You Cry" – Alice Faye
 "Ja-Da" – Alice Faye
 "The Vamp" – Alice Faye and chorus
 "I'm Always Chasing Rainbows" – orchestral
Alice Faye's vocal cut from film, on DVD as an "extra"
 "Rock-a-Bye Your Baby with a Dixie Melody" – Al Jolson
 "I'm Just Wild About Harry" – Alice Faye
 "California, Here I Come" – Al Jolson
 "Toot, Toot, Tootsie (Goo' Bye!)" – Al Jolson
 "April Showers"/"Avalon" – Al Jolson (cut from film, on DVD as an "extra")
 "The Japanese Sandman" – orchestral
 "Rose of Washington Square" – sung by Alice Faye,with specialty dancers Veloz and Yolanda in interlude
 "Mother Machree" 
 "I'll See You in My Dreams" – Alice Faye (cut from film;on DVD as an "extra")
 "I Never Knew Heaven Could Speak" – Alice Faye
 "Yoo Hoo"
  "My Mammy" – Al Jolson
 "My Man" – Alice Faye

Notes

References

External links

 

1939 films
1930s musical drama films
20th Century Fox films
American black-and-white films
American musical drama films
Films about musical theatre
Films directed by Gregory Ratoff
Films produced by Darryl F. Zanuck
Films set in the 1910s
Films set in the 1920s
Films set in New York City
Films with screenplays by Nunnally Johnson
1939 drama films
1930s English-language films
1930s American films